Larry J. Blake (April 24, 1914 – May 25, 1982) was an American actor.

Career

A native of Bay Ridge, Brooklyn, New York, he started his career in vaudeville as an impersonator, working his way to a headliner. After appearing at the Roxy Theatre and the Rainbow Room in New York City, he was offered a screen test with Universal studios. 

Signing in 1936, he first appeared in the serial Secret Agent X-9 (1937). He later appeared in The Road Back (1937), Trouble at Midnight (1938), Air Devils (1938), The Nurse From Brooklyn (1938), State Police (1938), and The Jury's Secret (1938).

Serving in the U.S. Navy during WWII, his alcoholism almost got him dishonorably discharged.  At the end of the war, he was sent to a California military hospital where a Jesuit priest introduced him to Alcoholics Anonymous.  

In 1947, Blake started the first Motion Picture AA group. For the next 35 years, he helped many inside and outside the film industry gain sobriety.'

Blake was part of an effort to bring vaudeville back in Los Angeles. 

Over the next 33 years he appeared in numerous films, including Sunset Boulevard, High Noon, Seven Brides For Seven Brothers, Portrait of a Mobster, The Shaggy Dog, Herbie Rides Again, and Time After Time (his last film appearance). 

Television credits included guest starring in James Arness's TV Western Series Gunsmoke (as a conspirator named “Dolph” in the 1956 episode “Hack Prine” (S1E26),  again as “Budge Carter” in the 1959 episode “There Never Was A Horse (S3E35) & twice in 1964; once as “Shell” in “The Promoter (S9E30) and again as “Man” in “Help Me Kitty” (S10E7), Straightaway, Here's Lucy, Adam-12, Have Gun – Will Travel, Perry Mason, The Waltons, Little House on the Prairie,  The Jerry Lewis Show, and Night Gallery. He was a regular on the Pride of the Family series (1953–54) and had a recurring role as the Jailer in Yancy Derringer (1958–59). In 1958 Blake appeared as the Posse Leader in the TV western Tales of Wells Fargo in the episode titled "Butch Cassidy."

Last years and death

Blake retired in 1979 due to emphysema.  

He died on May 25, 1982, and is interred at San Fernando Mission Cemetery.  His wife, Teresa, whom he married in 1936, died in 2005.

His only child, Michael, worked as a child actor before becoming a film/TV Makeup artist in 1978. Blake and his son never played father and son in any film or television show, although they did appear together in an episode of Kung Fu (1974) and in the film, One More Train to Rob (1971).

Filmography

Secret Agent X-9 (1937) - Chief FBI Agent Wheeler 
The Road Back (1937) - Weil
Trouble at Midnight (1937) - Tony Michaels 
The Jury's Secret (1938) - Bill Sheldon
State Police (1938) - Trigger Magee 
The Nurse from Brooklyn (1938) - Larry Craine
Air Devils (1938) - John P. 'Horseshoe' Donovan 
Sinners in Paradise (1938) - Thomas Sydney in Photographs (uncredited)
Young Fugitives (1938) - Silent Sam
They Made Her a Spy (1939) - Ben Dawson 
Sudden Money (1939) - Interviewer (uncredited)
Two Thoroughbreds (1939) - Truck Driver (uncredited)
The Boys from Syracuse (1940) - Announcer
Maisie Goes to Reno (1944) - Policeman (uncredited)
Behind Green Lights (1946) - Morgue Ambulance Driver (uncredited)
The Undercover Woman (1946) - Simon Gillette
Deadline for Murder (1946) - Hudson (uncredited)
 Strange Journey (1946) - Karl 
Magnificent Doll (1946) - Charles (uncredited)
The Trap (1946) - Rick Daniels 
The Beginning or the End (1947) - Tough Military Policeman (uncredited)
Smash-Up, the Story of a Woman (1947) - Radio Station Emcee (uncredited)
Backlash (1947) - Det. Lt. Jerry McMullen
Second Chance (1947) - Det. Sgt. Sharpe 
Call Northside 777 (1948) - Police Photographic Technician (uncredited)
The Hunted (1948) - Hollis Smith
 French Leave (1948) - Schultyz
Force of Evil (1948) - Detective (uncredited)
The Lucky Stiff (1949) - Louie Perez
Flamingo Road (1949) - Martin (uncredited)
Holiday Affair (1949) - Plainclothesman
The Blonde Bandit (1950) - Capt. Ed Roberts
Destination Big House (1950) - Pete Weiss
Kiss Tomorrow Goodbye (1950) - Telephone voice (uncredited)
Sunset Boulevard (1950) - 1st Finance Man 
One Too Many (1950) - Walt Williams
In Old Amarillo (1951) - Stan Benson (uncredited)
Inside the Walls of Folsom Prison (1951) - Tim Castle (uncredited)
Secrets of Beauty (1951) - Uncle Marty
Iron Man (1951) - Ralph Crowley (uncredited)
Rhubarb (1951) - Police Radio Voice (voice, uncredited)
The Marrying Kind (1952) - Benny (uncredited)
The Winning Team (1952) - Detective Blake (uncredited)
High Noon (1952) - Gillis - Saloon Owner (uncredited)
The Story of Will Rogers (1952) - House Detective (uncredited)
Stop, You're Killing Me (1952) - Police Captain (uncredited)
Angel Face (1953) - Detective Lt. Ed Brady (uncredited)
Never Wave at a WAC (1953) - Mr. Devlin (uncredited)
The Blue Gardenia (1953) - Music Shop Clerk (uncredited)
The System (1953) - Detective Conducting Line-Up (uncredited)
Remains to Be Seen (1953) - Detective Minetti
Cruisin' Down the River (1953) - Dave Singer
Devil's Canyon (1953) - Hysterical Prisoner (uncredited)
Champ for a Day (1953) - Gambler (uncredited)
City of Bad Men (1953) - Ticket Seller (uncredited)
The Great Diamond Robbery (1954) - Policeman (uncredited)
Seven Brides for Seven Brothers (1954) - Drunk (uncredited)
Dial Red O (1955) - Wayne - Waiter (uncredited)
Son of Sinbad (1955) - Samit (uncredited)
Creature with the Atom Brain (1955) - Reporter #2 
The Twinkle in God's Eye (1955) - Deputy (uncredited)
Teen-Age Crime Wave (1955) - State Police Sgt. Connors
I Died a Thousand Times (1955) - Healy (uncredited)
I'll Cry Tomorrow (1955) - AA Member (uncredited)
Inside Detroit (1956) - Max Harkness 
While the City Sleeps (1956) - Tim - Police Desk Sergeant
The Werewolf (1956) - Hank Durgis
Earth vs. the Flying Saucers (1956) - Motorcycle Cop
The Man Is Armed (1956) - Ray Perkins
You Can't Run Away from It (1956) - Detective
Rumble on the Docks (1956) - Officer Fitz
Badlands of Montana (1957) - First Outlaw (uncredited)
Beau James (1957) - Reporter (uncredited)
Beginning of the End (1957) - Illinois Highway Patrolman
Jeanne Eagels (1957) - Reporter (uncredited)
Band of Angels (1957) - Auctioneer (uncredited)
Man of a Thousand Faces (1957) - David T. Stone (uncredited)
Escape from San Quentin (1957) - Mack
Outcasts of the City (1958)
Too Much, Too Soon (1958) - Reporter (uncredited)
City of Fear (1959) - Police Sergeant (uncredited)
The Shaggy Dog (1959) - Police Officer Ed Mercer (uncredited)
Who Was That Lady? (1960) - Tenant (uncredited)
Elmer Gantry (1960) - Mac - Bartender (uncredited)
Portrait of a Mobster (1961) - John Murphy 
Sex and the Single Girl (1964) - Policeman (uncredited)
Harlow (1965) - Editor (uncredited)
That Funny Feeling (1965) - Policeman #2
That Darn Cat! (1965) - Police Officer (uncredited)
The Rare Breed (1966) - Auctioneer (uncredited)
The Swinger (1966) - Honest Hal (uncredited)
A Covenant with Death (1967) - Houseman (uncredited)
The Adventures of Bullwhip Griffin (1967) - Saloon Barker (uncredited)
Eight on the Lam (1967) - Police Officer (uncredited)
The One and Only, Genuine, Original Family Band (1968) - First Outspoken Man (uncredited)
Hang 'Em High (1968) - Prisoner in Compound 
Where Were You When the Lights Went Out? (1968) - Salesman (uncredited)
The Love Bug (1968) - Track Timekeeper (uncredited)
Hook, Line & Sinker (1969) - Chief of Police (uncredited)
Which Way to the Front? (1970) - Engineer (uncredited)
One More Train to Rob (1971) - Barber (uncredited)
Diamonds Are Forever (1971) - Water Balloon Game Barker-Operator (uncredited)
The Stone Killer (1973) - Police Commissioner
Herbie Rides Again (1974) - Police Officer
The Strongest Man in the World (1975) - Pete
Demon Seed (1977) - Cameron
Time After Time (1979) - Guard (final film role)

References

External links
 

1914 births
1982 deaths
American male film actors
American male television actors
Burials at San Fernando Mission Cemetery
Respiratory disease deaths in California
Deaths from emphysema
Male actors from New York City
People from Bay Ridge, Brooklyn
20th-century American male actors
United States Navy personnel of World War II